This is the list of the stations in the Valparaíso Metro in the boroughs or comunas of Valparaíso, Viña del Mar, Quilpué, Villa Alemana and the city of Limache, all part of the city of Valparaíso, capital of region Valparaíso and Chile's third biggest, most populous and important city, except for Limache, a suburban city in region Valparaíso.

List of metro stations

Valparaíso borough
 Puerto
 Bellavista
 Francia
 Barón
 Caleta Portales

Viña del Mar borough
 Recreo
 Miramar
 Viña del Mar
 Hospital
 Chorrillos
 El Salto

Quilpué borough
 Quilpué
 El Sol
 El Belloto

Villa Alemana borough
 Las Américas
 Concepción
 Villa Alemana
 Sargento Aldea
 Peñablanca

Suburban trip, deferred frequencies

City of Limache
Limache

See also
Santiago Metro
Biotren, Concepción
List of metro systems

External links
Metro Valparaíso

Valparaiso
Valparaiso (Metro)
Buildings and structures in Valparaíso Region
Metro Stations
Rapid transit in Chile
Transport in Valparaíso Region